John C. Rensenbrink (August 30, 1928 – July 30, 2022) was an American political scientist, philosopher, journalist, conservationist, and political activist. He has initiated and helped found many organizations, the most prominent of which are the Maine Green Party (1984); the Green Party of the United States (1984–87) for both of which he was a principal founder; and CREA (the Cathance River Education Alliance) 2000 to the present, a hands-on ecological education project for local schools, schoolchildren and high school students in mid-coast Maine.

Early life and education
Rensenbrink was born in 1928 in rural Pease, Minnesota, one of seven children of Dutch-American farming parents. His mother, Effie (Koiman), was born in the Netherlands; his father, John Rensenbrink, was the eldest son of Dutch immigrants.

Rensenbrink and his brother Henry operated the dairy farm upon their father's untimely death in 1943. Unable to attend high school, Rensenbrink took a correspondence course conducted by the American School in Chicago. He left the farm in 1946 to attend Calvin College, an Evangelical college in Grand Rapids, Michigan; his mother and siblings moved to that city the following year. Rensenbrink studied history, English and philosophy at Calvin and was editor of the college newspaper during his junior and senior years. He graduated from Calvin with a BA in 1950. He then entered the University of Michigan in Ann Arbor, focused primarily on political philosophy, and received a master's degree in political science in 1951.  This was followed by a Fulbright Scholarship to study at the University of Amsterdam from 1951 to 1952. Thereafter, he studied at the University of Chicago, concentrating on political philosophy, American politics, and constitutional law, and completed his Ph.D. in political science from that university in 1956. His Ph.D. thesis was entitled "Technology and Utopia: the Structure of Freedom".

Academic and other professional work
Rensenbrink began teaching at Coe College in Cedar Rapids, Iowa in 1956. After a year at Coe teaching history and international relations, he taught political philosophy and American government at Williams College in Williamstown, Massachusetts, for four years (1957–61).  As he prepared for his first class at Williams in the summer of 1957, Rensenbrink met Carla Washburne in her father's College Bookstore in Williamstown. Carla was a rising Junior at Radcliffe College in Cambridge, Massachusetts. They married in June 1959, shortly after Carla's graduation.

They moved to Maine in 1961. Rensenbrink taught political philosophy and history at Bowdoin College in Brunswick, Maine, for one year before taking a job in 1962 for three years as Education Advisor to the governments of Kenya and Tanzania, sponsored by the U.S. Agency for International Development. He and Carla and their daughters Kathryn and Margaret, (born in Dar es Salaam), aged three and one respectively, returned to Bowdoin College in 1965. Rensenbrink was promoted to the tenured position of associate professor in 1968 and to full professor in 1974. The Rensenbrinks' third child, Elizabeth, was born in January 1968.

Rensenbrink spent the first six months of 1983 in Poland, accompanied by his wife and three daughters, as a research professor at the Marie Sklodowska University in Lublin, sponsored jointly by that university and Lock Haven State University in Pennsylvania. This was during the suppression of the Solidarity movement. Eluding the watchful eye of the Communist regime's secret police, he researched and studied the sources and shape of social change as represented by Solidarity. He wrote his first book, based on that experience, in 1988, published by the University of Louisiana Press, "Poland Challenges a Divided World."  In it he accurately predicted the non-violent overthrow of the Communist regime and the victory of the Solidarity movement, events which surprised the world in 1989 and led rapidly thereafter to the demolition of the Berlin Wall and the fall of the Communist regime in Russia.

Following semi-retirement in 1989, Rensenbrink continued teaching at Bowdoin for several years, creating an interdisciplinary seminar for majors in Black, Women's, and Environmental Studies. Starting in the mid-90s and continuing to the present, Rensenbrink has participated in the International Society for Universal Dialogue (ISUD), founded by Janusz Kuczynski (now deceased), head of the philosophy department at the University of Warsaw. He has presented several papers at their world Congresses, held every two years, and served as its secretary and vice president before being elected president at the Helsinki Congress in 2005. Serving as president for two years, he organized the 7th Congress of ISUD at Hiroshima in Japan in 2007. His presidential address was on cross-cultural dialogue as a major factor in the search for peace.

Rensenbrink delivered one of three Key Note addresses to the 11th Congress of ISUD in Warsaw on July 11, 2016.  It was titled, "Co-Evolution—Basis for Inter-Active Dialogue."

Political work
Rensenbrink's first foray into politics was a letter-to-the-editor at the age of 14 praising Minnesota's political leader Harold Stassen. The letter appeared in the Minneapolis Star Journal. It was the first of many letters to the editor in that newspaper during the next several years. While in college Rensenbrink participated in a popular campaign to unseat the mayor of Grand Rapids. Shortly after, at the University of Michigan in 1951–52, he joined the Young Republicans, but found himself disgusted with the politics of Joseph McCarthy.

Rensenbrink left the Republican Party and became a Democrat after listening to the speeches of Adlai Stevenson, the Democratic nominee for president in 1952 and 1956. In 1968, following the assassinations of Martin Luther King and Robert F. Kennedy, and following Chicago Democratic Mayor Daley's police crackdown of student protestors at the national Democratic nominating convention in Chicago, Rensenbrink formed with others the Reform Democrats of Maine (1968 to 1970). The attempt was to help end the Vietnam War and to reform the Democratic Party. In 1976 and 1978, Rensenbrink ran in the Democratic primary for the Lewiston/Auburn/Topsham Senate seat of the Maine legislature. The district was heavily Democratic so that a victory in the primary ensures victory in the general election. He came up short both times, losing by only 170 votes in 1978.  During the early 1980s, Rensenbrink joined with others in campaigns to close Maine's only nuclear plant. The campaigns were battles lost, by close margins, but the struggle against nuclear power was won in terms of public opinion. The nuclear plant, "Maine Yankee," closed down within several years of these campaigns.

The Green Party
1984 was a decisive year for Rensenbrink. While in Poland the previous year, he had heard about the Germany elections which West Germany of Green Party have candidates. They had won 27 seats in the nation's Parliament. That summer, on his way back to the United States, Rensenbrink stopped off in Munich and in Frankfurt to visit friends who had joined the German Green Party and were celebrating their unexpected Parliamentary success. That fall, back in Maine and Bowdoin College, Alan Philbrook, a fellow anti-nuclear activist, called to say he had been at the first meeting of the Greens in Canada and, on his return to Maine, registered the Green Party of Maine. The two then called a meeting for January 14, 1984, to consider forming a Green Party organization in Maine. This was accomplished in Augusta on that date—the first of its kind, as they later discovered, in the United States.

Rensenbrink quickly made plans to seek early retirement (which was accomplished in 1989) and threw himself into Green Party organizing in Maine and in the United States. A meeting in St. Paul, Minnesota was followed by regular monthly meetings of what was first called the Committees of Correspondence, later changed to Green Committees of Correspondence, with a Clearing House in Kansas City headed by Dee Berry. Working with the Clearing House, the annual gathering of a Green Assembly, and the Inter-Regional Committee that had formed, Rensenbrink headed a three-year project to produce a Green Policy Program, generated from the over 300 grass roots groups that had sprung up in the early years. The Program was completed and approved in September 1990, at the annual meeting of the Green Assembly in Boulder, Colorado. Thereafter, Rensenbrink, with others, formed the Green Politics Network whose aim was the eventual creation of a national Green Party of associated state Green Parties. The result was the Association of State Green Parties (ASGP), which, from 1996 to 2001 grew to include all of the state Green parties and then morphed into the Green Party of the United States in 2001. Rensenbrink has continued to be active in the USGP's National Committee and annual Conventions and Presidential campaigns and in its International Committee, which he had founded in 1997 as part of ASGP.

Rensenbrink was the Maine Green Party's candidate for U.S. Senator in 1996 against Republican Susan Collins and Democrat Joe Brennan. and received 4% of the vote. The Maine Green Party changed its name to Maine Green Independent Party (MGIP) in 1998. It has grown steadily. With more than 41,000 Maine residents enrolled in the party, it has the largest per capita membership of any Green Party in the United States. It fielded a candidate for governor in each four-year election cycle from 1994 to 2006, getting 10% of the vote in 2002 and 2006. Rensenbrink worked as campaign manager for two gubernatorial campaigns: Jonathan Carter in 1994 and Pat LaMarche in 1998 and worked as a major advisor in the others. MGIP has run 10 or more candidates for the state legislature in most elections, placing one in the state House of Representatives in 2002 and 2004. It has become the second party after the Democrats in Maine's largest city, Portland, and, for several years, has had three of its members in the Portland City Council. It has also elected several members to the School Board.

Community work

Rensenbrink helped found Merrymeeting Community Action (MCA) in mid-coast Maine in 1966–1967. Together with Professor Paul Hazelton of Bowdoin College's Education Department, Rensenbrink developed and wrote for MCA the first successfully funded anti-poverty program in Maine and served on MCA's board of directors for several years.

In 1999, Rensenbrink, together with his wife Carla and several fellow townspeople, created Topsham's Future, a citizen action group dedicated to balancing the then very rapid economic development of Topsham with the preservation and vitality of community values and neighborhood integrity. One of its major accomplishments was creation of the Cathance River Nature Preserve through extended negotiations with retirement-community developer John Wasileski. Building on their success in the negotiation, Rensenbrink and Wasileski joined together to found the Cathance River Education Alliance a program in 2000. The program provides hands-on ecological education for thousands of students and teachers in area schools. In 2019, the road leading to the CERA office was renamed "Rensenbrink Way."

Together with several other concerned and influential citizens of Topsham in 2008, Rensenbrink helped defeat at the polls a proposal to replace Topsham's Town Meeting form of government with a council form of government. Following this they persuaded the town Select Board to create a Topsham Government Improvement Committee. This committee, chaired by Rensenbrink, produced a Report recommending improvements in Topsham's Town Meeting, some of which have been instituted with others pending.

Rensenbrink, as part of his goal to help develop an international community of strong ecological and politically alert activists from among Greens and Green-minded people, established the Green Horizon Foundation in 2002, and continued as its president. Among its projects, it publishes Green Horizon Magazine, which got its start in 2003. Rensenbrink was its chief editor together with co-editor Steve Welzer of the New Jersey Green Party. The foundation also conducts a website (www.Green-Horizon.org) and does book publishing.

Death
Rensenbrink died on July 30, 2022.

Selected awards

 Praxis Award for Distinguished Achievement in the Role of Scholar and Activist, presented September 2, 1994, by the American Political Science Association's Organized Section on Transformational Politics
 Award presented in 2004 by the Maine Green Independent Party "For 20 years of outstanding service to the Green movement in Maine and the Maine Green Independent Party." 
 Award presented in 2006 by the Cathance River Education Alliance "In appreciation for co-founding CREA."
 Portrait painted by Rob Shetterly – Arranged by the Maine Green Independent Party on the occasion of the 25th anniversary of the party, May 2009. The portrait is part of the series of paintings by Rob Shetterly on "Americans Who Tell the Truth."

Publications
 How Change Does and Does Not Take Place: Maine Case Studies of Innovation in Education Reform Programs, ERIC Document, Resources in Education, Arlington, VA; Document Number ED 127664, 1977
 The Theory and Practice of Undistorted Communication, Analysis of the State Town Meeting Project 1990, Maine Humanities Council, Portland, Maine.
 Poland Challenges a Divided World, Louisiana State University Press, 1988
 The Greens and the Politics of Transformation, Preface by Jay Walljasper R&E Miles Publishers, 1992
 Against All Odds, the Green Transformation of American Politics, foreword by Ralph Nader, Leopold Press 1999
 Ecological Politics: For Survival and Democracy, Lexington Books, 2017

Selected articles
 "A Study in Praxis: the Caucus for a New Political Science."  New Political Science, Winter 1980
 "Beyond Polis and Cosmopolis: Green Pathways to a New Universalism." In Dialogue and Universalism, Vol. V, No. 5,vWarsaw, 1995.
 "Security, Democracy, and World Governance."  In The Global Greens, Edited by Margaret Blakers. The Green Institute, Canberra 2001
 "The Dalai Lama on Suffering and Compassion, an Ontological Critique." In Proceedings of the Fifth World Congress of the International Society for Universal Dialogue. Published by Skepsis, Athens 2004. 
 "Dialogue and Being – An Ontological Investigation." In Dialogue and Universalism, Vol XXIII, No. 3/2013.

External links 

 Appearances on C-SPAN

References

1928 births
2022 deaths
American people of Dutch descent
American political scientists
Bowdoin College faculty
Calvin University alumni
Coe College faculty
Green Party of the United States politicians
Maine Democrats
Maine Greens
People from Mille Lacs County, Minnesota
People from Topsham, Maine
University of Chicago alumni
University of Michigan alumni
Williams College faculty